Monument, released in 1983, is a live album by the British band Ultravox. It is the soundtrack to the live video of the same name, recorded at the London Hammersmith Odeon during the band's 1982 "Monument" tour. The album peaked at no.9 on the UK album chart and was certified Gold by the BPI in January 1984 for 100,000 copies sold.

The opening title track is not live and is identical to the version found on the B-side of the "Hymn" single.

The album was re-issued on CD in 1999 and was expanded, containing all of the songs from the video (but still not the entire concert).

Monument was released again in 2009, as a CD/DVD package together.

Track listing
All songs written by Warren Cann, Chris Cross, Billy Currie, and Midge Ure.

Original track listing from UK first release

Side one
"Monument" - 3:15
"Reap the Wild Wind" [Live] – 4:11
"The Voice" [Live] - 6:54

Side two
"Vienna" [Live] - 5:24
"Mine For Life" [Live] - 4:40
"Hymn" [Live] - 5:40

Track listing from 1999 UK CD re-issue

"Monument" - 3:15
"Reap the Wild Wind" [Live] – 4:10
"Visions In Blue" [Live] - 4:38
"The Voice" [Live] - 6:51
"Vienna" [Live] - 5:23
"Passing Strangers" [Live] - 5:28
"Mine For Life" [Live] - 4:25
"Hymn" [Live] - 5:40

CD track listing from 2009 UK CD/DVD re-issue

"Monument" - 3:15
"Reap the Wild Wind" [Live] – 4:10
"Visions In Blue" [Live] - 4:41
"The Voice" [Live] - 6:50
"Vienna" [Live] - 5:23
"Passing Strangers" [Live] - 5:12
"Mine For Life" [Live] - 4:38
"Hymn" [Live] - 5:46
"The Song (We Go)" [Live] - 5:12

DVD track listing from 2009 UK CD/DVD re-issue

"Introduction"
"Reap The Wild Wind [Live]"
"The Voice [Live]"
"Vienna [Live]"
"Mine For Life [Live]"
"Hymn [Live]"
"End Credits"

Personnel
On Stage:
 Warren Cann - drums, backing vocals
 Chris Cross - bass, synthesizer, backing vocals
 Billy Currie - keyboards, violin
 Midge Ure - guitar, keyboards, lead vocals
Messengers (Danny Mitchell, Colin King) - Backing vocals

Additional personnel
 John Hudson - Producer
 Brian Cooke - Photography

References

1983 live albums
Ultravox live albums
Chrysalis Records live albums